Job Taunted by his Wife is an oil-on-canvas painting by the French artist Georges de La Tour, produced at an unknown date between 1620 and 1650. It depicts a scene from the Old Testament in which Job, a once rich and influential man who in a short space of time lost his children, his possessions and his health but not his piety, is being chided by his wife for maintaining his faith and urged to curse God and die. The painting is now in the Musée départemental d'art ancien et contemporain in the French town of Épinal.  

Originally misattributed to an unknown 17th-century Italian painter, it was acquired by its present owner in 1829 and reattributed to de La Tour in 1922, a reattribution confirmed by a 1972 restoration which revealed the painter's signature.

Charles Sterling argues the work was produced in the painter's youth, but Pierre Rosenberg argues it was produced at the end of his career around 1650.

References

17th-century paintings
Paintings by Georges de La Tour
Paintings in Grand Est
Paintings depicting Hebrew Bible people
Job (biblical figure)